Pablo Ridson Francisco (born January 4, 1974) is an American comedian, actor and writer. He started his career doing improv in Tempe, Arizona.

Career
In the 1990s, he appeared on MADtv as a featured player. His stand-up act was introduced to America at large when he landed his own half-hour comedy special on Comedy Central Presents in 2000. In 2001 and 2002, Francisco toured as part of "The Three Amigos" with Carlos Mencia and Freddy Soto. Since then, he has performed on The Tonight Show with Jay Leno, VH1's ILL-ustrated, Mind of Mencia as "The Voiceover Dude" (same as "Movie Voiceover Guy"), and Frank TV.

Francisco is recognized for vocal impressions of famous people including Jackie Chan, Aaron Neville, Arnold Schwarzenegger, Howard Stern, Casey Kasem, Keanu Reeves, Michael J. Fox, Jerry Springer, Don Lapre, Celine Dion, William Hung, Danny Glover, Gary Busey, and most notably Don LaFontaine (the Movie Voiceover King). He also does sound effects and character voices like Count Dracula (as a Spanish Radio DeeJay), Droopy Dog, Chris Rock, R2-D2, Kermit the Frog, Stone Cold Steve Austin, Ozzy Osbourne, Ricky Martin, George Clooney, Dennis Haysbert, Anthony Sullivan, Christopher Walken, and Mr. Magoo. He also has a talent for beatboxing.

In 2004, he performed a set at the Irvine Spectrum Center Improv club, which was filmed and released as the DVD Bits and Pieces. His stand-up material was also used in Comedy Central's animated series Shorties Watchin' Shorties.

Television appearances
 MADtv
 Make Me Laugh
 The Tonight Show with Jay Leno
 VH1's ILL-ustrated
 Mind of Mencia (as The Voiceover Dude)
 Frank TV
 Vakna Med the Voice (Swedish TV)
 Just for Laughs Festival in Montreal
 Last Comic Standing
 Tonight with Trevor Noah
 Late Night with Jimmy Fallon
 Gabriel Iglesias Presents Stand-Up Revolution
 Comics Unleashed with Byron Allen
 Shorties Watchin' Shorties

Specials
 Comedy Central Presents (2000)
 The Three Amigos (with Carlos Mencia and Freddy Soto) (2002)
 Bits and Pieces (2004, DVD/CD)
 Ouch!! (2006, DVD)
  They Put It Out There (2011, DVD)

Discography
 Knee to the Groin (1997)
 Sausage (2000)
 3 (2003)

References

External links
Official website

Pablo Francisco at MySpace

1974 births
Living people
American impressionists (entertainers)
American stand-up comedians
American people of Chilean descent
People from Tucson, Arizona
People from Casa Grande, Arizona
American sketch comedians
20th-century American comedians
21st-century American comedians